James, Jim or Jimmy Weir may refer to:

Sportspeople
James Weir (footballer) (born 1995), English football player for MTK Budapest
Jerry Weir (1851–1889), Scottish footballer (Queen's Park and Scotland)
Jim Weir (born 1969), Scottish footballer (Hamilton Academical, Heart of Midlothian, St. Johnstone)
Jim Weir (basketball), American college basketball player
Jimmy Weir (footballer, born 1864) (1864–?), Scottish footballer (Dumbarton, Gateshead, Sunderland Albion)
Jimmy Weir (footballer, born 1887) (1887–1959), Scottish footballer (Celtic, Middlesbrough)
Jimmy Weir (footballer, born 1939), Scottish footballer (Fulham, York City, Mansfield Town, Luton Town, Tranmere Rovers)

Politicians
James Weir (politician) (1863–1949), Canadian politician, Alberta MLA (1917–1921)
James Galloway Weir (1839–1911), Scottish businessman and Liberal Party politician
Jim Weir (diplomat) (1922–2012), New Zealand diplomat

Others
James Weir (architect) (1845–1905), Wesleyan Methodist church architect
James George Weir (1887–1973), Scottish aviator
James Kenneth Weir (1905–1975), Scottish peer and businessman
James Robert Weir (1882–1943), American botanist

See also
James Weir Building, an academic building in Glasgow, Scotland
James Weir House, an historic building in Tazewell, Tennessee